The Azariah Newton House is an historic house at 44 Silver Hill Road in Milford, Massachusetts.  It is a -story wood-frame Cape style house, with a side-gable roof, clapboard siding, and large central chimney.  The interior has retained substantial interior finishing, including floors, fireplaces, and room layout.  The house was built in 1747 by Azariah Newton, one of the area's early settlers, and is one of Milford's oldest houses.

The house was listed on the National Register of Historic Places in 1999.

See also
National Register of Historic Places listings in Worcester County, Massachusetts

References

Houses in Worcester County, Massachusetts
Houses completed in 1747
Milford, Massachusetts
Houses on the National Register of Historic Places in Worcester County, Massachusetts